Robert Van Grootenbruele (5 March 1907 – 16 June 1998) was a Belgian racing cyclist. He rode in the 1931 Tour de France.

References

External links
 

1907 births
1998 deaths
Belgian male cyclists
People from Zottegem
Cyclists from East Flanders